Howard Stearns (born August 28, 1955) is an American football coach.  He was the 12th head football coach at Eastern New Mexico University in Portales, New Mexico and he held that position for two seasons, from 1992 until 1993.  His coaching record at Eastern New Mexico was 6–13–1.

References

1955 births
Living people
Eastern New Mexico Greyhounds football coaches
Place of birth missing (living people)